Vishnyovoye is a rural locality (a village) in Unechsky District, Bryansk Oblast, Russia. The population was 16 as of 2010. There are 2 streets.

Geography 
Vishnyovoye is located 38 km southeast of Unecha (the district's administrative centre) by road. Starye Ivaytyonki is the nearest rural locality.

References 

Rural localities in Unechsky District